The Federation Council ( – Sovet Federacii, common abbreviation: Совфед – Sovfed), or Senate (officially, starting from July 1, 2020), is the upper house of the Federal Assembly of Russia  (the parliament of the  Russian Federation), according to the 1993 Constitution of the Russian Federation.

Each of the 89 federal subjects of Russia (including two annexed in 2014 and four more in 2022, that are not recognized by the international community) – consisting of 24 republics, 48 oblasts, nine krais, three federal cities, four autonomous okrugs, and one autonomous oblast – sends two senators to the Council, for a total membership of 178 Senators. In addition, the Constitution also provides for senators from the Russian Federation, which can be no more than 30 (up to seven of them for life), as well as (optionally) former presidents as life senators ( there are no such life senators).

The council holds its sessions within the Main Building on Bolshaya Dmitrovka Street in Moscow, the former home of the Soviet State Building Agency (Gosstroy), with further offices and committee rooms located on Novy Arbat Street. The two houses of the Federal Assembly are physically separated, with the State Duma residing in another part of Moscow on Okhotny Ryad Street. Sessions of the Federation Council take place in Moscow from January 25 to July 15, and from September 16 to December 31. Sessions are open to the public, although the location of sessions can change if the Federation Council so desires, and secure closed sessions may be convoked.

For purposes of succession, the chairman of the Federation Council is the third-highest position in the Russian Federation, after the president and the prime minister. In the case of incapacity of the President and Prime Minister, the chairman of the Federation Council becomes the Acting President of the Russian Federation.

History

The modern history of the Federation Council begins during the 1993 Constitutional Crisis that pitted President Boris Yeltsin's unpopular neoliberal and governmental structure reforms against the increasingly radical Congress of People's Deputies, the nation's legislature. Throughout the year, the congress had grown increasingly dissatisfied with Yeltsin and his cabinet's management of the floundering Russian economy, as well as with its plans for a new constitution for the Russian Federation to replace the Soviet-era 1978 Russian SFSR Constitution still in effect. Amidst the increasingly tense crisis, on September 21, Yeltsin issued Presidential Decree No.1400. The decree effectively scrapped constitutional reform then presently in discussion, as well as legally dissolving the Congress of People's Deputies, ordering its replacement with an entirely new federal legislative structure, and granting the president increased executive powers. Following a war of words and acts of defiance from both sides, President Yeltsin abruptly ended the governmental power struggle by ordering the Russian army to bombard and storm the White House of Russia, the legislative building, between October 2–4, 1993.

Following the crushing of the Congress of People's Deputies and other members of the federal and territorial governments who had initially supported what he viewed as a rebellious legislature, Yeltsin proceeded to present a new constitution. With the events of 1993 very much in mind, Yeltsin drafted a constitution that called for increased executive branch powers in prime ministerial appointments, veto overrides, and a stronger executive security council. The constitution also called for the creation of a bicameral Federal Assembly, consisting of a State Duma and a Federation Council. Although a Federation Council had been created by Yeltsin in July 1993 to gather regional representatives (except Chechnya) to support an earlier draft of a replacement constitution to the 1978 document, this Federation Council was to become a permanent part of the legislature.

The procedure of formation of the Federation Council through elections held according to the majority system was defined by Presidential Decrees No. 1626 from October 11, 1993 "On Elections to the Council of Federation of the Federal Assembly of the Russian Federation" and No. 1846 from November 6, 1993 "On Specification to the Resolution on Elections of Deputies to the State Duma and Resolution on Elections of Deputies to the Council of Federation of the Federal Assembly of the Russian Federation in 1993".

Similar to the United States Senate, the Federation Council would consist of two representatives from each of Russia's federal subjects. Unlike the State Duma, which consisted of hundreds of districts across the nation, the Federation Council was to act as more or less the voice of Russia's federated subdivisions. Early debate on its creation centered on whether or not the Federation Council should be elected at all. To solve some problems on the Council's first scheduled election in December, Yeltsin issued Presidential Decree No. 1628 on October 11, stipulating that candidates for the first elections needed at least two percent, or 25,000 signatures—whichever was highest—of their oblast, republic, krai, autonomous okrug, or federal city population. This helped previous territorial elites remain within national politics. The decree also stipulated a single term of two years before new elections in 1995.

The Council's first elections were held on December 12, 1993, simultaneously with State Duma elections and a referendum on the new Constitution of the Russian Federation. With the constitution now in effect after its successful passage, elections for the Council were to be franchised solely to territorial authorities, with one senator elected from the subject's legislature, and the other by the subject's executive branch. This later was codified in 1995 when the Council's first term expired.

The constitution, however, did not specify how senators were to be elected. By 1995, using this constitutional anomaly, regional executives could sit ex officio in both their  regional executive posts and within the Federation Council. While the State Duma did much of the serious debates on Russian policy during this time, the Council became a lobby for regional interests, competing for federal attention.

The ascension of President Vladimir Putin following Yeltsin's resignation on December 31, 1999, brought many new changes to the Federation Council. As part of his top political goals in his first months of office in 2000, Putin proposed a reform law to change the makeup of the Council which would allow regional governors to designate councillors but not sit on the Council themselves, freeing it from what Putin saw as blatant personal cronyism on the part of regional leaders. The Council furiously resisted Putin's plan, conscious that their role in federal politics, their very ability to enjoy the fruits of living within Moscow, and their parliamentary immunity would end. With the State Duma threatening to override a Council veto, and Putin's threats to open federal criminal investigations on regional governors, the Council backed down and grudgingly supported the law in July 2000. In their place, a wave of new Kremlin-friendly senators took the vacated seats, complete with the full backing of Putin. The last of these dual senator-governors were rotated out of office in early 2002.

Following the Beslan school hostage crisis in September 2004, President Putin initiated a radical shakeup of the federal system, proposing that the direct elections of regional governors be replaced by appointments from the president himself. These appointments could later be confirmed or rejected by the regional legislatures. The move further placed more control over the Council by the executive branch, due to laws which stipulate that regional executives have a say in choosing delegates to the Federation council.

Since 2000, the Federation Council has largely remained a stable body. However, critics have charged that Putin's tactics in reforming the Council were blatantly undemocratic and anti-federal, arguing that the reforms created a rubber stamp body for the executive branch and the ruling United Russia party, similar to what the Soviet of Nationalities was during the Soviet period.

Officers and members

As set in Article 101 of the Russian Constitution, the Federation Council “shall elect among its deputies the chairman of the Council.” Some of the Chairman's official duties include presiding over sessions, formulating and introducing draft agendas, issuing orders and consulting with the Council's various committees, acting as the Council's official representative in the Federal Assembly, and signing resolutions to be passed forth to the president or the State Duma.

The current chairman is Valentina Matviyenko.

Senators are able to retain membership in their respective parties. However, they are asked not to bring party factionalism to the floor itself. Since the reforms of 2000, the Council has enjoyed a significantly close relationship with the Kremlin, helping the easy passage of key legislation the Kremlin desires.

According to Article 98, all the members of the Council enjoy immunity from arrest, detainment, and searches. In 2007 the law on the Federation Council was amended, and now a senator must have resided for at least ten years in the territory he is representing.

The status of members of the Federation Council is defined by the Federal Law: "On Status of Members of the Council of Federation and Status of Deputy of the State Duma of the Federal Assembly of the Russian Federation".

Presidium 
The presidium consists of a chairman, four deputy chairmen and a general secretary.

Political affiliation
Unlike the State Duma, with its division of parties and leaders, in 2002 parliamentary groups were forbidden following Mironov's election to the chairmanship and the parliamentary procedures to disband all political factions though the members are affiliated with some major Russian political parties.

Elections
Unlike the State Duma and the provincial legislatures throughout Russia, the Council is not directly elected, but instead chosen by territorial politicians, resembling in some respects the structure of the U.S. Senate prior to the Seventeenth Amendment in 1913. The only exclusion was the first Federation council (1994–1996), which was elected on December 12, 1993.

According to Article 95, the Council comprises representatives of each Russian federal subject—two from each.  One senator is elected by the provincial legislature, and the other is nominated by the provincial governor and confirmed by the legislature. Prior to 2000, all provincial governors and heads of provincial legislatures were also members of the Council. Upon President Putin's ascension to the Russian presidency, this practice was discontinued under pressure from the Kremlin, forbidding governors to hold dual posts.

Terms to the Council are also not nationally fixed, due to the continuing territorial nature of the chamber. Terms instead are determined according to the regional bodies they represent.

In 2001–2004 regional bodies were able to recall their senator by the same procedure by which they appointed them. Such recalls once occurred quite often. But a new law passed in December 2004 required that a recall procedure must be first initiated by the chairman of the Federation Council. The procedure has not been implemented since.

On January 1, 2013, the latest Law on the Procedure to Form the Federation Council entered into force: According to the Law, the Federation Council consists of two delegates from each Russian constituent component, one representing the given region's legislative assembly and the other representing the provincial executive authorities. There will be two different election procedures, one for each type of member. (Federal Law No. 229, art. 1.1.) Candidates for the Senator from a constituent component's legislature must be a member of the component region's legislative assembly. Candidates are nominated as a candidate by the chairman of the regional legislative assembly, by one party faction represented in the assembly, or by at least one-fifth of the assembly members. Then, the regional legislative assembly will vote for one of the nominated candidates.

An amendment to the law was approved in July 2014, which add 17 more senators who are nominated by the president.

The second type of delegate to the Federation Council, the regional executive authority representative, is appointed by the Governor of that constituent component (or the Head of that autonomous republic). The delegate is selected from among three people named by the candidates for the office of governor/head of the concerned region. The winner of the gubernatorial/republican leadership election appoints one of the three delegates previously named for appointment to the Council as a senator of said region.

Powers
The Federation Council is viewed as a more formal chamber of the Federal Assembly. Because of its federalist design, as well as its voting franchise strictly limited to provincial elites, the Council is viewed as less volatile to radical changes.

The Council is charged with cooperating with the State Duma in completing and voting on draft laws. Federal laws concerning budgets, customs regulations, credit monitoring, and the ratification of international treaties are to be considered by the Council after they have been adopted from the State Duma, where most legislation is introduced.

Special powers that are accorded only to senators of the Federation Council are:

 Approval of changes in borders between the subjects of the Russian Federation;
 Approval of a decree of the President of the Russian Federation on the introduction of martial law;
 Approval of a decree of the President of the Russian Federation on the introduction of a state of emergency;
 Deciding on the possibility of using the Armed Forces of the Russian Federation outside the territory of the Russian Federation;
 Declaring of elections of the President of the Russian Federation;
 Impeachment of the President of the Russian Federation;
 Approving the president's nomination of judges of the Constitutional Court of the Russian Federation, of the Supreme Court of the Russian Federation, of the Supreme Arbitration Court of the Russian Federal government
 Approving the president's nomination  of the Prosecutor General of the Russian Federation;
 Appointment of Deputy Chairman and half of the auditors of the Accounting Chamber.

For laws to pass the Federation Council, a vote of more than half of its 187 senators is required. When considering federal constitutional laws, three-fourths of the Council's votes are required for passage. If the Council vetoes a law passed by the State Duma, the two chambers are mandated to form a Conciliation Committee in order to form a compromise document, on which both houses would have to vote again. The Federation Council's veto can be overcome by a two-thirds majority of Duma deputies.

Committees

Committees form a key component of the structure of the Council. Sixteen committees and seven commissions exist for senators to consider legislation and policy on several issues ranging from foreign affairs, federal affairs, and youth and sports. Leadership in these committees are determined by the Council Chairman, who remains in correspondence with their findings. These committees include:

Committee on Constitutional Legislation
Committee on Judicial and Legal Affairs
Committee on Defence and Security
Budgetary Committee
Committee on Financial Markets and Currency Circulation
Foreign Affairs Committee
Committee on the Commonwealth of Independent States
Committee on Federal Affairs and Regional Policies
Committee on Local Government
Social Policy Committee
Committee on Economic Policy, Business and Ownership
Industrial Policy Committee
Committee on Natural Resources and Environmental Protection
Committee on Food and Agricultural Policies
Committee for Science, Culture, Education, Public Health and Ecology
Committee on Northern Territories and Indigenous Minorities
Commission on Standing Orders and Parliamentary Performance Organisation
Commission for the Council of Federation's Performance Maintenance Monitoring
Commission on Ways and Means of the Council of Federation's Constitutional Powers Implementation
Commission for Interaction with the Accounts Chamber of the Russian Federation
Commission on Youth and Sports
Commission on Information Policy
Commission on Natural Monopolies

Chairpeople of the Federation Council

Vladimir Shumeyko 13 January 1994 – 23 January 1996
Yegor Stroyev 23 January 1996 – 5 December 2001
Sergey Mironov 5 December 2001 – 18 May 2011
Aleksander Torshin 19 May – 21 September 2011 (Acting)
Valentina Matviyenko 21 September 2011 – present day

Presidential Envoys to the Federation Council

 Aleksandr Yakovlev (18 February 1994 – 10 February 1996; as Presidential Envoy to the Federal Assembly)
 Anatoly Sliva (10 February 1996 – 27 October 1998)
 Yury Yarov (7 December 1998 – 13 April 1999)
 Vyacheslav Khizhnyakov (12 May 1999 – 5 April 2004)
 Alexander Kotenkov (5 April 2004 – 30 October 2013)
 Artur Muravyov (Since 30 October 2013)

See also
List of deputy chairmen of the Federation Council of Russia
Politics of Russia

Notes

References
McFaul, Michael. Russia's Unfinished Revolution. Ithaca, New York: Cornell University Press, 2001.
Herspring, Dale R. Putin's Russia. Lanham, Maryland: Rowman and Littlefield Publishers, 2005.

External links

 Official Website of the Federation Council 
 Official Website of the Federation Council 
 Official Website of the Chairman of the Federation Council

 
1993 establishments in Russia
Russia
Federal Assembly (Russia)